Hollinsclough is a civil parish in the district of Staffordshire Moorlands, Staffordshire, England. It contains six listed buildings that are recorded in the National Heritage List for England.  Of these, one is at Grade II*, the middle of the three grades, and the others are at Grade II, the lowest grade.  The parish contains the village of Hollinsclough and the surrounding countryside.  The listed buildings consist of farmhouses and farm buildings, a house and associated structures, a chapel, and a church with an attached school.


Key

Buildings

See also

Listed buildings in Longnor
Listed buildings in Quarnford
Listed buildings in Heathylee

References

Citations

Sources

Lists of listed buildings in Staffordshire